Emmanuel Weingkro Izonritei (Izon-Eritei) (born 31 October 1978) is a boxer from Bayelsa State of Nigeria.Boxer at the 2003 Afro-Asian Games India (Gold Medallist).  He was an athlete in the 2004 Summer Olympics for Nigeria, where he lost in the round of 16 (Heavyweight (91 kg) division) to Naser Al Shami of Syria, who eventually won the bronze.  In 2003, he won gold against Mohamed Elsayed in the All-Africa Games in Abuja, Nigeria.  His brother David won a silver model in boxing in the 1992 Summer Olympics. Served in the Nigeria Airforce  1999 - 2005, also Served in the British Army 2008 -2013, He did a tour of Afghanistan "OP Herrick 10" 2009.

References

Boxer at the 2003 All African Games (Gold Medallist)
Boxer at the 2003 Afro-Asian Games India (Gold Medallist)

1978 births
Olympic boxers of Nigeria
Living people
Boxers at the 2004 Summer Olympics
Boxers at the 2006 Commonwealth Games
Commonwealth Games competitors for Nigeria
Heavyweight boxers
Nigerian male boxers
African Games gold medalists for Nigeria
African Games medalists in boxing
Competitors at the 2003 All-Africa Games